The 35th (Brown's) Texas Cavalry Regiment was a unit of mounted volunteers from Texas that fought in the Confederate States Army during the American Civil War. The regiment was created by merging the 12th Texas Cavalry Battalion and Rountree's Texas Cavalry Battalion in October 1863. The new unit's commander was Reuben R. Brown. Its first assignment was to threaten Fort Esperanza, which Federal troops had recently captured. An attack on the fort failed at the end of December 1863. From February 1864 until the end of the war, the regiment patrolled the Texas Gulf Coast. The unit officially surrendered on 2 June 1865.

See also
List of Texas Civil War Confederate units
Texas in the American Civil War

Notes

References

Units and formations of the Confederate States Army from Texas
1863 establishments in Texas
1865 disestablishments in Texas
Military units and formations disestablished in 1865
Military units and formations established in 1863